Vernon Faithfull Storr (4 December 1869 – 25 October 1940) was an Anglican priest, most notably Archdeacon of Westminster from 1931 to 1936.

Early life and education
The son of Edward Storr (1840–1878), Indian Civil Service (a descendant of the goldsmith and silversmith Paul Storr, through which his cousins included Rev. Frank Utterton, Archdeacon of Surrey from 1906 to 1908, the obstetrician Sir Francis Champneys, 1st Baronet and his brothers Basil Champneys and Weldon Champneys, the artists Rex Whistler and Laurence Whistler, and the academic Michael Lindsay, 2nd Baron Lindsay of Birker) and Emily Mary (née Faithfull), Storr was born at Madras. He was educated at Clifton College and The Queen's College, Oxford - he was the Aubrey Moore Student in 1893. Storr was a fellow of University College, Oxford, from 1895 to 1899; and then again from 1905 to 1913.

Ordained ministry
Storr was ordained deacon in 1900, and priest in 1901. His first post was a curacy in Haslemere. He was Rector of Bramshott from 1902 to 1905; and of Headbourne Worthy from 1905 to 1910. He was a Canon Residentiary at Winchester Cathedral from 1910 to 1916; Rector of Bentley from 1916 to 1921; and a Canon of Westminster from 1921. Additionally in 1936 he became Rector of St Margaret's, Westminster and Sub-Dean of the abbey.

Theistic evolution

Vernon Storr was an advocate of theistic evolution. In 1940, he wrote:

"There need be no opposition between evolution and theism. The old argument from Design, as Paley stated it, is undoubtedly dead; but evolution is not the enemy of design, but requires design for its adequate explanation."

Selected works

Carnegie was an author. Amongst others he wrote:

 Development and Divine Purpose, 1906
 The Development of English Theology in the 19th Century, 1800–1860, 1913
 Christianity and Immortality, 1918
 The Problem of the Cross, 1919
 The Argument from Design, 1920
 The Missionary Genius of the Bible, 1924
 The Living God, 1925
 From Abraham to Christ,1927)
 Freedom and Tradition, 1940

References

External links
Geni
Son's obituary

1869 births
1940 deaths
20th-century English Anglican priests
Alumni of The Queen's College, Oxford
Archdeacons of Westminster
Christian clergy from Chennai
Fellows of University College, Oxford
People educated at Clifton College
Theistic evolutionists